The Bremerhaven–Cuxhaven railway (also called the Nordseebahn or North Sea Railway) is a railway line between Bremerhaven and Cuxhaven, opened in 1899. Since December 14, 2003, passenger trains on the line are operated by the company with the same name, a joint venture of DB Regio AG and EVB.

The line is part of the Kursbuchstrecke 125 (Bremen-Bremerhaven-Cuxhaven) and operated with LINT 41 vehicles.

Services operate hourly between 05:00 and 23:00 Monday to Saturday, with a bi-hourly schedule on weekends. Some trains continue past Bremerhaven and terminate in Bremen Hbf.

Stations
The stations have been extensively modernised since Nordseebahn GmbH has taken over traffic on the line. The points in Nordholz have been removed, though, thus no additional traffic on the line is possible due to scheduling restrictions.

Stations serviced until 1991 were Altenwalde, Spieka, Midlum and Mulsum. Prior to that, the stations in Imsum and Bremerhaven-Speckenbüttel were closed.

Former traffic
The line is no longer used by freight traffic. If trains between Cuxhaven and Maschen have to be diverted due to maintenance work on the Niederelbebahn, passenger trains on the Nordseebahn have to be cancelled.

The line saw its last long-distance trains in 2001. Prior to that date InterRegio trains from Luxembourg and Saarbrücken called at all stations and terminated at Cuxhaven.

References 

Railway lines in Lower Saxony
Standard gauge railways in Germany